Maja Bošković-Stulli (9 November 1922 – 14 August 2012) was a Croatian slavicist and folklorist, literary historian, writer, publisher and an academic, noted for her extensive research of Croatian oral literature.

Early life

Bošković-Stulli was born in Osijek to a Jewish family of Dragutin and Ivanka Bošković. She joined the Young Communist League of Yugoslavia – SKOJ (from Serbo-Croatian: Savez komunističke omladine Jugoslavije) during Gymnasium education. In 1943, after the capitulation of Italy and liberation of the Rab concentration camp, she joined the Partisans. Many members of her family perished during the Holocaust, including her parents and sister Magda.

Education and later years
Bošković-Stulli finished elementary and secondary school in Zagreb. She graduated from the Faculty of Philosophy in Zagreb and received her PhD in 1961. She took part in many national and international conferences and symposiums, including the Inter-University Centre in Dubrovnik. For many years she was chief editor, and afterwards a regular member, of the editorial board for the journal Narodna umjetnost. She worked at the Croatian Academy of Sciences and Arts, and from 1952 until her retirement in 1979 she worked at the Institute of Ethnology and Folklore Research in Zagreb. From 1963-73 she was the Director of the Institute.

Bošković-Stulli wrote around twenty books and a large number of papers in national and international academic journals. She has received a number of awards for her research work, the annual award in 1975 and the Croatian lifework award in 1990, the Herder Prize in Vienna 1991, and Pitre Salomone Marino prize in Palermo 1992. She was a regular member at the Croatian Academy of Sciences and Arts.

In 2005 Bošković-Stulli was named among 35 Croatia's most important women in history. Bošković-Stulli died on 14 August 2012 in Zagreb and was buried at the Mirogoj Cemetery.

Works
 Istarske narodne priče, Zagreb 1959
 Narodne pripovijetke ("Pet stoljeća hrvatske književnosti"), Zagreb 1963
 Narodne epske pjesme, knj. 2 ("Pet stoljeća hrvatske književnosti"), Zagreb 1964
 Narodna predaja o vladarevoj tajni, Zagreb 1967
 Usmena književnost ("Povijest hrvatske književnosti" 1, pp. 7–353), Zagreb 1978
 Usmena književnost nekad i danas, Beograd 1983
 Usmeno pjesništvo u obzorju književnosti, Zagreb 1984;
 Zakopano zlato. Hrvatske usmene pripovijetke, predaje i legende iz Istre, Pula – Rijeka 1986
 U kralja od Norina. Priče, pjesme, zagonetke i poslovice s Neretve, Metković – Opuzen 1987
 Pjesme, priče, fantastika, Zagreb 1991;
 Žito posred mora. Usmene priče iz Dalmacije, Split 1993
 Priče i pričanje: stoljeća usmene hrvatske proze, Zagreb 1997
 Usmene pripovijetke i predaje ("Stoljeća hrvatske književnosti"), Zagreb 1997
 O usmenoj tradiciji i o životu, Zagreb 1999

References

Bibliography

External links
Bošković-Stulli's biography, at the Matica hrvatska's website

1922 births
2012 deaths
People from Osijek
Burials at Mirogoj Cemetery
Croatian communists
Croatian women writers
Croatian Jews
20th-century Croatian historians
Jewish historians
Jewish socialists
Jewish writers
Faculty of Science, University of Zagreb alumni
Members of the Croatian Academy of Sciences and Arts
Rab concentration camp survivors
Yugoslav Partisans members
Yugoslav Jews
Yugoslav women writers
Yugoslav academics
Yugoslav historians
20th-century Croatian women writers
Herder Prize recipients
Women in the Yugoslav Partisans
Women historians
Jews in the Yugoslav Partisans